Doyali Islam is a Canadian poet. She is most noted for her 2019 poetry collection heft, which was a finalist for the 2020 Griffin Poetry Prize.

Her poems have appeared in a number of literary magazines including The Kenyon Review Online and The Fiddlehead, and in a number of anthologies including Best Canadian Poetry and The Manifesto Project.

Her first poetry collection, Yusuf and the Lotus Flower, was published by Ottawa small press BuschekBooks in 2011.

She has been the poetry editor of Arc Poetry Magazine, and the editor of Write, the Writers' Union of Canada's member magazine.

Works

References

External links

21st-century Canadian poets
21st-century Canadian women writers
Canadian women poets
Writers from Toronto
Living people
1984 births